Derk Pereboom (born 1957) is the Susan Linn Sage Professor in Philosophy and Ethics at Cornell University. He specializes in free will and moral responsibility, philosophy of mind, philosophy of religion, and the work of Immanuel Kant.

Life and career
Derk Pereboom was born in the village of Pesse, near Hoogeveen, the Netherlands, on February 6, 1957. He received his BA in philosophy at Calvin College in Grand Rapids, Michigan, in 1978, where his teachers included Alvin Plantinga and Nicholas Wolterstorff. He earned his PhD at University of California, Los Angeles in 1985, with a dissertation on Immanuel Kant's theory of mental representation under the supervision of Robert Merrihew Adams and Tyler Burge. 

He was an assistant professor in the Department of Philosophy at the University of Vermont from 1985 to 1991, associate professor from 1991 to 1997, and professor from 1997 to 2007.  he has been professor in the Sage School of Philosophy at Cornell University.

 he is the subject co-editor on topics in the philosophy of action for the Stanford Encyclopedia of Philosophy, and he has also written for the encyclopedia.

Philosophical work

Free will

Pereboom's position in the free will debate is  known as hard incompatibilism. He maintains that due to general facts about the nature of the universe, we lack the free will required for the aspect of moral responsibility at issue in the traditional debate. That is, whether our actions are deterministically or indeterministically caused, we will not have the control in action required for our deserving to be blamed or punished for immoral decisions, and to be praised or rewarded for those that are morally exemplary. Pereboom nevertheless proposes that forward-looking aspects of blaming and praising, those that aim, for instance, at improving character and reconciliation in relationships, are compatible with our lacking free will. He also contends that denying free will is likely to diminish anger and the desire to punish, and in this way can benefit human relationships, both personal and societal. In this respect his position is inspired by the view of Baruch Spinoza, who argues in his Ethics that denying free will would enhance the quality of human life.

Philosophy of mind

The physicalist position Pereboom proposes in philosophy of mind develops two responses to the hard problem of consciousness, which is explicated by Frank Cameron Jackson's knowledge argument and David Chalmers' conceivability argument against physicalism. The first response invokes the possibility that introspective representations fail to represent mental properties as they are in themselves; specifically, that introspection represents phenomenally conscious properties as having certain characteristic qualitative natures which these properties actually lack. This position is related to the more general illusionism about consciousness advanced by Daniel Dennett and to an illusionist view set out by neuroscientist Michael Graziano. The second response draws on the Russellian monist proposal that currently unknown fundamental intrinsic properties provide categorical bases for known physical properties and also yield an account of consciousness. There are non-physicalist versions of this position, but some are amenable to physicalism, and Pereboom highlights such views in his treatment.

Pereboom defends a version of nonreductive physicalism, a view proposed by Hilary Putnam in the 1960s, according to which types of mental states are not identical to types of states at lower levels, such as the neural and the microphysical. The nonreductive position he defends departs from others in that it also rejects all token-identity (i.e., specific-instance-identity) claims for the relation between mental states and states at lower levels. The relation between the mental and the microphysical is material constitution, with the provision that this relation is not to be explicated by the notion of identity. But mental properties are nevertheless identical to higher-level compositional properties, properties that things have by virtue of the natures of their parts and relations among them. Pereboom contends that this view secures genuine mental causation, by contrast with the more commonly endorsed functionalist alternative. In this respect his position is perhaps a compromise with type-identity theory. Still, his view is not a reductive identity theory, since he holds that mental compositional properties are multiply realizable at any level more fundamental than the mental (e.g., the neural).

Selected publications

Authored books

Edited books

Articles

References

External links
 

Living people
Cornell University faculty
University of California, Los Angeles alumni
Calvin University alumni
1957 births
University of Vermont faculty
Philosophers of mind
Metaphysicians